Paul Moody may refer to:

Paul Moody (footballer) (born 1967), retired English football forward
Paul Moody (inventor) (1779–1831), American textile machinery inventor
Paul Dwight Moody (1879–1947), Presbyterian clergyman